Ron Riley (born December 23, 1973) is an American former professional basketball player.

References

External links
D-League statistics @ basketball-reference.com
Ron Riley @ The Draft Review

1973 births
Living people
Alaska Aces (PBA) players
American expatriate basketball people in Austria
American expatriate basketball people in the Philippines
American expatriate basketball people in Syria
American men's basketball players
Arizona State Sun Devils men's basketball players
Basketball coaches from Nevada
Basketball players from Nevada
Huntsville Flight players
Philippine Basketball Association imports
Providence Argonauts men's basketball coaches
Rockford Lightning players
Seattle SuperSonics draft picks
Shooting guards
Small forwards
Sportspeople from Las Vegas